The 1937 South Africa tour to Australasia was one of the most successful Springbok tours in history, so much so that the touring team was nicknamed the "Invincibles". The squad was captained by Philip Nel.

The tour started on 26 June 1937 at the Sydney Cricket Ground in Sydney, Australia with a 9–5 win over the Wallabies. The Springboks followed up the win with an emphatic 26–17 win on 17 July at the same grounds, outscoring the Wallabies 6 tries to 3 and taking the series 2–0.

When the Springboks arrived in New Zealand later that year nobody expected them to win the series, as no other South African team had ever achieved the feat, and when the New Zealand leg of the tour kicked off on 14 August with a 13–7 loss to New Zealand at Athletic Park in Wellington, it seemed business as usual.

Mr Nel and his men had other ideas however as they came back to deal New Zealand two convincing defeats; a 13–6 win at Lancaster Park in Christchurch and a 17–6 win at Eden Park in Auckland, taking the series 2–1. The latter translates into a 27–6 (5 try to nil) win using today's point system.

The 1937 Springbok team remains the only Springbok team ever to have won a series in New Zealand and contained legendary players such as Danie Craven and Boy Louw.

Matches in Australia

Scores and results list South Africa's points tally first.

Matches in New Zealand
Scores and results list South Africa's points tally first.

 

1937 
1937
1937 in Australian rugby union
1937 in New Zealand rugby union
1937 in South African rugby union